Martin Victor Ferrero (born September 29, 1947) is an American actor. His most well known roles are Izzy Moreno in Miami Vice (1984-1989) and Donald Gennaro in the 1993 film Jurassic Park.

Life and career
Ferrero was born in Brockport, New York. He joined the California Actors Theater in Los Gatos, California. In 1979, he moved to Los Angeles and began to act in Hollywood. He is widely remembered for his role as the ill-fated lawyer Donald Gennaro in Jurassic Park (1993). He appeared as a regular on the 1980s TV series Miami Vice playing the comic relief character Izzy Moreno, an informant with a malapropism infused Cuban accent and involved in a variety of outlandish business ventures. He initially appeared in the pilot episode as assassin Trini DeSoto. 

He also guest-starred on an episode of Cheers ("Rescue Me", season 3), playing the role of an Italian waiter. In addition, he has appeared in Get Shorty (1995), Gods and Monsters (1998), and The Tailor of Panama (2001). As of 2008, Ferrero is a member of the Antaeus Company, a Los Angeles classical theater ensemble. In 2011, Ferrero reprised the role of Donald Gennaro in a CollegeHumor parody of Jurassic Park.

Filmography

Film

Television

References

External links
 

1947 births
20th-century American male actors
21st-century American male actors
American male film actors
American male stage actors
American male television actors
American people of Italian descent
Living people
San Jose State University alumni